N,O-Dimethylhydroxylamine is a methylated hydroxylamine used to form so called 'Weinreb amides' for use in the Weinreb ketone synthesis. It is commercially available as its hydrochloride salt.

Synthesis
It may be prepared by reacting ethyl chloroformate (or similar) with hydroxylamine followed by treatment with a methylating agent such as dimethyl sulfate. The N,O-dimethylhydroxylamine is then liberated by acid hydrolysis followed by neutralization.

See also
 Methoxyamine
 N-methylhydroxylamine

References

Hydroxylamines